Răchitoasa is a commune in Bacău County, Romania.

Răchitoasa may also refer to:

 Răchitoasa River (Sacovăț), a tributary of the Sacovăț River in Romania
 Răchitoasa River (Zeletin), a tributary of the Zeletin River in Romania

See also 
 Răchita (disambiguation)
 Răchiți
 Răchitiș (disambiguation)
 Răchițele (disambiguation)
 Răchitova (disambiguation)
 Răchita River (disambiguation)